This is a list of Samford Bulldogs football players in the NFL Draft.

Key

Selections

References

Samford

Samford Bulldogs NFL Draft